The first season of the American streaming television series Iron Fist, which is based on the Marvel Comics character of the same name, follows Danny Rand as he returns to New York City after being presumed dead for 15 years and must choose between his family's legacy and his duties as the Iron Fist. It is set in the Marvel Cinematic Universe (MCU), sharing continuity with the films and other television series of the franchise. The season was produced by Marvel Television in association with ABC Studios and Devilina Productions, with Scott Buck serving as showrunner.

Finn Jones stars as Rand, alongside Jessica Henwick, Tom Pelphrey, Jessica Stroup, Ramón Rodríguez, Sacha Dhawan, Rosario Dawson, and David Wenham. Development for the series began in late 2013, with Buck hired as the series' showrunner in December 2015 and Jones cast as Rand in February 2016. Filming took place in New York City from April to October 2016, with a focus placed on exploring the "One Percent of the One Percent" through story, location, and costume design. The character's martial arts background is also explored, and each episode is named after Shaolin Kung Fu sequences. As the last of several Marvel Netflix seasons to release before the crossover miniseries The Defenders, it features set-up for that event and references to those prior seasons.

The season premiered on March 15, 2017, in New York City, with the full season of 13 episodes released on Netflix on March 17. It received generally negative reviews from critics, particularly for its pace and storytelling, and Jones's performance. The appropriateness of his casting and storyline in terms of race was also widely discussed, while the season's fight sequences were criticized as an important element that were poorly acted, choreographed, and edited. Conversely, Henwick's performance and the use of established characters Claire Temple and Jeri Hogarth did receive some praise. Third-party data analytics determined the series had strong initial viewership, but this dropped within a week. The series was renewed for a second season in July 2017.

Episodes

Cast and characters

Main 
 Finn Jones as Danny Rand / Iron Fist
 Jessica Henwick as Colleen Wing
 Tom Pelphrey as Ward Meachum
 Jessica Stroup as Joy Meachum
 Ramón Rodríguez as Bakuto
 Sacha Dhawan as Davos
 Rosario Dawson as Claire Temple
 David Wenham as Harold Meachum

Recurring
 David Furr as Wendell Rand
 Barrett Doss as Megan
 Alex Wyse as Kyle
 Marquis Rodriguez as Darryl
 Wai Ching Ho as Gao
 Ramon Fernandez as Kevin Singleton
 Clifton Davis as Lawrence Wilkins
 John Sanders as Donald Hooper
 Elise Santora as Maria Rodriguez

Notable guests
 Carrie-Anne Moss as Jeri Hogarth
 Tijuana Ricks as Thembi Wallace
 Suzanne H. Smart as Shirley Benson

Production

Development 
In October 2013, Deadline reported that Marvel Television was preparing four drama series and a miniseries, totaling 60 episodes, to present to video on demand services and cable providers, with Netflix, Amazon, and WGN America expressing interest. A few weeks later, Marvel and Disney announced that Marvel Television and ABC Studios would provide Netflix with live action series centered around Iron Fist, Daredevil, Jessica Jones, and Luke Cage, leading up to a miniseries based on the Defenders. In April 2015, the official title was revealed to be Marvel's Iron Fist, and that December, Marvel announced that Scott Buck would serve as showrunner. John Dahl, Cindy Holland, Allie Goss, Alison Engel, Kris Henigman, Alan Fine, Stan Lee, Joe Quesada, Dan Buckley, Jim Chory, Loeb and Buck serve as executive producers on the series.

Writing 
Each episode of the season is named after Shaolin Kung Fu sequences. Quesada stated in July 2016 that "there's a lot going on" in the season, with Buck and the season's writers weaving together "some great legends from Marvel present and past" including what Quesada believed to be the most antagonists in a single season of a Marvel Netflix series. Buck likened Iron Fist to a mystery, saying, "It's very much about how do you go about proving who you are when there's no way to do that, and that's not just the story, that's also the theme of it". The season begins with Danny Rand returning to New York after having been missing, presumed dead, for 15 years. Buck said that much of the season was "about a journey of finding self ... in terms of what he wants to be as far as 'Who is Danny Rand? What is the Iron Fist?’ and then, 'How do these things get together?'" Loeb described the structure of the season as building "through a series of sort of metaphorical fights, which is very important in a martial arts film, to sort of show how the character needs to grow from the innocent, wide-eyed person to someone who has to come to terms with ‘this is the way the outside world works—how am I going to make it work for me?’".

Continuing on the idea from the previous Marvel Netflix series that New York City is a "fifth Defender", Loeb said the season would examine the high-end financial world of New York City, examining "the One Percent of the One Percent and how that affects our world on a day-to-day basis... high-level corporation, Big Pharma, things like that". Actor Finn Jones added the season examined "corporate corruption and corporate responsibility in the modern world, and... how much do corporations have impact on society? And what we actually look at in the show is the heroin epidemic of the city, and how corporations maybe actually fund the heroin epidemic, and what that means to society". In terms of Rand donning a comic-based costume in the season, Buck stated, "There was no good reason we could imagine to put Danny Rand in a costume. Because Danny Rand is still discovering who he is as a hero and where he is going to be, so he's not yet ready to put on a mask or a costume. [A]t the same time he is someone who is rather well known as a billionaire, so he can't necessarily go out in public and do the things he does without being recognized. It does become an issue for the character."

Casting 
The main cast for the season includes Jones as Danny Rand / Iron Fist, Jessica Henwick as Colleen Wing, Tom Pelphrey as Ward Meachum, Jessica Stroup as Joy Meachum, Ramón Rodríguez as Bakuto, Sacha Dhawan as Davos, Rosario Dawson as Claire Temple, and David Wenham as Harold Meachum. Dawson reprises her role from previous Marvel Netflix series.

Recurring throughout the season are David Furr as Wendell Rand, Danny's father; Barrett Doss as Megan, a Rand Enterprises secretary; Alex Wyse as Kyle, Harold Meachum's personal assistant; and Ramon Fernandez as Kevin Singleton, Harold Meachum's bodyguard. Wai Ching Ho recurs as Gao, reprising her role from Daredevil, and Marquis Rodriguez recurs as Darryl, reprising his role from Luke Cage. Clifton Davis, John Sanders, and Elise Santora portray Lawrence Wilkins, Donald Hooper, and Maria Rodriguez, respectively, members of the Rand Enterprise board. Also returning from previous Marvel Netflix series are Carrie-Anne Moss as Jeri Hogarth, Tijuana Ricks as Thembi Wallace, and Suzanne H. Smart as Shirley Benson.

Design 
Stephanie Maslansky is the costume designer for Iron Fist, after serving the same role for the previous Marvel Netflix series. Maslansky noted one of the differences with the season compared to the other Marvel Netflix series, was the neighborhoods it spent time in ("the wealthier neighborhoods; Midtown, Upper East Side, that sort of thing") compared to Hell's Kitchen for Daredevil and Jessica Jones and Harlem for Luke Cage. As such, Rand wears more suits than the other heroes, and given the amount of fighting he does in the season, a lot of spandex was added to increase the suits' flexibility. Rand's look evolves throughout the season, with Maslansky noting, "When we first meet him he's clearly traveled a long way. I wanted people to look at Danny and not be sure exactly what he was. A backpacker, or a homeless man. His look needed to reflect a variety of culture [and almost feel] otherworldly." Once Rand enters the corporate world, he settles on an "Urban Cali" style, which is "a little looser, little more relaxed. But it's still a suit. His tie is never tied tightly and he always wears sneakers." This relaxed style for Rand also provided "a strong contrast" to Ward Meachum who is a "far more corporate looking person." The monk costumes and Rand's warrior costume was based on "real Shaolin warrior monk costumes... I took that distinctive silhouette from the Shaolin warrior monk clothing, and we combined it with the traditional colors of the Iron Fist, green and gold." Regarding Gao, Maslansky stated "Her particular look is influenced by ancient China," particularly the Terracotta Army and further progresses the "villainy" look of the Marvel Netflix series of "surround[ing] themselves with [money], with beautiful things."

Filming 

Marvel announced in February 2014 that the series would be filmed in New York City, with Quesada stating in April that the show would be filming on location in addition to sound stage work. Photography began in April 2016 in New York City, with the working title Kick. Manuel Billeter served as director of photography after doing the same for the first seasons of Jessica Jones and Luke Cage.

Filming locations included Mariners Harbor and Sailors' Snug Harbor on Staten Island, which served as Bakuto's compound; 28 Liberty Street for the exterior of Rand Enterprises, while some interiors were filmed in the MetLife Building; 19 Gramercy Park South for Joy Meachum's home; City Hall Park; Chinatown, including Mott Street; the lobby of the General Electric Building for Harold Meachum's penthouse; the Manhattan Bridge; Green-Wood Cemetery; Bank of America Tower; Bryant Park; the Presidential Suite in the InterContinental New York Barclay Hotel, serving as Rand's temporary apartment; the STK Midtown restaurant; Brooklyn Navy Yard; Pelham Bay Park; the Bayonne Bridge, which doubled as Anzhou, China; and Sutton Place Park. Filming wrapped on October 8, 2016.

Iron Fist was filmed in high dynamic range (HDR), which Billeter stated added "a learning curve" to his work, forcing him to rethink how he would shoot certain scenes, such as a car lights or street lights, which become much brighter in HDR than previously. To compensate, lights would be painted on set to help "bring down the highlights". Post-production vendor Deluxe worked on the season to adjust colors the filming team did not have the chance to tweak on set.

Fight training and choreography 
Brett Chan was the stunt-coordinator, fight choreographer, and second unit director for the season, having "full involvement in all the episodes". Buck wanted the fighting in the series to be mostly Wing Chun but with the animal styles of kung fu as well, and Chan worked alongside Buck and other Marvel executives during development of the fights. As a second unit director, the amount of creative input that Chan had depended on the episodic director he was working with. Chan was influenced by the works of the Shaw Brothers, Jackie Chan, Stephen Chow, Bruce Lee, and Yuen Woo Ping, but avoided being "floaty or wire-like" per a request from Marvel; wire work and CGI were used minimally for fights.

Chan worked closely with Jones during early preparation for the season, but during filming spent most of his time either choreographing sequences or working on-set. Chan noted that Jones had a very busy schedule, and it was difficult to find the time to train him in martial arts which Chan felt was "a lifestyle" and "isn't something you can just pick up, or train for every once in a while. It's something you need to be really involved in". He did note that Henwick trained for six hours every day regardless if she was scheduled to train that day or if she was filming. Jones elaborated that he had three weeks before filming began to train for the season, during which time he would spend two and a half hours a day training in martial arts before doing weight training in the afternoons. Once filming began, Jones had a day and a half during weekends in which he could continue his training, and otherwise would have to learn fight choreography 15 minutes before filming an action sequence. He described this process as "a baptism of fire and I just learned on the job".

Music 
The executive producers wanted the score to feel modern, and composer Trevor Morris agreed not to use an orchestra. He did try some instruments to represent the Asian influence on the series, but these were deemed "too traditional" by the producers. Only some "heavily affected" Japanese flutes were ultimately used. Morris also looked to avoid using themes for different characters in a traditional way. He did write a theme for Rand, which is heard in the series' title sequence, as well as a theme for the Hand, but in general focused on environmental music. Additional music heard in the season includes "So Fresh, So Clean" by Outkast, "Krystal Karrington" by Camp Lo, "Heat of the Moment" by Killah Priest, "Black Mags" by The Cool Kids, "Hang N' Bang" by Vince Staples, "Blockbuster Night, Pt. 1" by Run the Jewels, and music from A Tribe Called Quest.

A soundtrack album featuring Morris's score was released by Marvel digitally on March 17, 2017, coinciding with the release of the season. Also included is the album-only single "Come Down", by Anderson .Paak. All music by Trevor Morris, except where noted:

Marvel Cinematic Universe tie-ins 
In working around the other Marvel Netflix series, Buck described "a fair amount of freedom", but "because we are leading into The Defenders, we have to leave our show in a very specific place with our character, because we do sort of plant seeds and stories that will then come to fruition in The Defenders. There does have to be a lot of cooperation between all the different [series' showrunners]. But other than that, we work distinctly by ourselves." The season makes references to the events of The Avengers, the Hulk, Stark Industries, Jessica Jones, Daredevil, Luke Cage, and Seagate Prison, and mentions the Dogs of Hell biker gang, New York Bulletin editor-in-chief Mitchell Ellison and reporter Karen Page, Roxxon Oil and Midland Circle. The events of the second season of Daredevil, such as the Hand's attack on Metro General Hospital, are noted throughout the season, and the Hand's blood draining facility from that season is also seen.

Marketing 
In October 2016, Buck and the season's main cast promoted the season at New York Comic-Con, debuting exclusive footage from the season and the first look at the first trailer. In early February 2017, the official trailer for the season was released. David Betancourt, reacting to the trailer for The Washington Post, compared the story it presents to that of Batman Begins (2005), and questioned the fact that Iron Fist's comic costume was not shown. Eric Francisco at Inverse noted that the trailer was widely criticized on Twitter for the season's depiction of Rand as an "insufferable college hippie". On March 15, 2017, the season held its premiere at the Tribeca Performing Arts Center in New York City.

Release 
The first season of Iron Fist was released on March 17, 2017, on the streaming service Netflix worldwide, in Ultra HD 4K and HDR. The season, along with the additional Iron Fist season and the other Marvel Netflix series, was removed from Netflix on March 1, 2022, due to Netflix's license for the series ending and Disney regaining the rights. The season became available on Disney+ in the United States, Canada, United Kingdom, Ireland, Australia, and New Zealand on March 16, ahead of its debut in Disney+'s other markets by the end of 2022.

Reception

Audience viewership 
Netflix does not reveal subscriber viewership numbers for their series, but Parrot Analytics determined that the season generated over 63 million "Demand Expressions" at its peak, behind only Luke Cages 69 million in terms of all the Marvel Netflix series, with Parrot calculating expressions "by evaluating streaming video, P2P-sharing, social chatter, and more." 7Park Data, which measures the number of streams on subscription video services, determined Iron Fist to be the most binge-watched premiere for Netflix in 2017 with 54.7% of Iron Fist streams on March 17, 2017, being of three episodes or more. The average score was 46.9%. 7Park Data also determined that Iron Fist accounted for 14.6% of all Netflix streams on its premiere date, the highest percentage of any series premiere measured by the company including previous Marvel Netflix premieres.

Parrot later revealed that demand for Iron Fist a week after it launched was halved. This was the largest drop in retention for a Marvel Netflix series, indicating "that people started binge-watching the show in its first few days and then didn't come back to finish the season the next weekend." The marketing analytics firm Jumpshot determined the season was the third-most viewed Netflix season in the first 30 days after it premiered, garnering 28% of the viewers that the second season of Daredevil received, which was the firm believed was the most viewed season. Jumpshot, which "analyzes click-stream data from an online panel of more than 100 million consumers", looked at the viewing behavior and activity of the company's U.S. members, factoring in the relative number of U.S. Netflix viewers who watched at least one episode of the season.

Critical response 

The review aggregator website Rotten Tomatoes reported a 20% approval rating with an average rating of 4.20/10 based on 85 reviews. The website's critical consensus reads, "Despite some promising moments, Iron Fist is weighed down by an absence of momentum and originality." Metacritic, which uses a weighted average, assigned a score of 37 out of 100 based on reviews from 21 critics, indicating "generally unfavorable reviews".

Reviewing the first six episodes of the season, Daniel Fienberg of The Hollywood Reporter found Iron Fist to be the "first big misstep" for Marvel and Netflix, lacking the "street-level authenticity" that their previous series had. Fienberg felt Jones was unable to elevate the material, instead coming across as "a spoiled frat boy". He said the season lacked basic character archetypes such as "a worthy adversary to our hero", comic relief, or a "voice of wise authority". Varietys Maureen Ryan gave a negative review for the first two episodes, calling them "ferociously boring" and "inessential". After criticizing the pacing, action, general characterization, production design, cinematography, and dialogue, Ryan suggested that Henwick should have been the star of the season instead of Jones.

Rob Sheffield of Rolling Stone criticized Jones' performance, calling him "totally devoid of charisma, more cub than lone wolf." He also felt the character was missing humor and inner turmoil, and said Rand's "mystic Zen quotes go over like a Wayne's World set-up minus the punch line." Allison Keene of Collider awarded the season 3 stars out of 5 after seeing the first six episodes. She said the season had a good cast and great origin story, but had a "glacial pace" and choppy editing. She did find Jones charming, but agreed with Fienberg that the season was lacking a villain, and felt that Temple was "shoe-horned" into the season. In his review for Screen Crush, Kevin Fitzpatrick stated, "Iron Fist needed to be so much weirder than it actually is, akin to how Doctor Strange (2016) essentially re-told the Iron Man (2008) story with enough out-there visuals and eccentric supporting characters to paper over any shortcomings. Iron Fist starts to show signs of life in its sixth episode... but the slog in getting there is too great an ask, especially when the vast majority of the principal characters [are so] underdeveloped." Fitzpatrick felt that Colleen Wing was the better of the supporting characters, and praised Henwick's performance.

Uproxx's Alan Sepinwall felt of the first six episodes, "It's easily the worst of the Netflix Marvel shows", criticizing the pacing and "miscasting" of Jones. He was more positive about Moss and Dawson's roles. Sepinwall concluded, "the biggest problem with the new show is that no one involved seems to have any kind of take on the material. They’re just making a mostly faithful but personality-free adaptation because someone at Marvel decided four years ago that Danny had to be [in The Defenders, and as a result,] we got a show that's so lifeless that I have no interest in finishing out the season". Dan Jolin also gave 3 stars out of 5 in his review for Empire. He felt it was beneficial that Iron Fist released after Doctor Strange introduced the MCU to "all his Eastern-mystical baggage", and called Iron Fist "a fresh presence" compared to "moody, conflicted heroism" of the other Defenders. Jolin did criticize that Buck had "no sense of connection to his subject" as previous Marvel Netflix showrunners had, and felt it was not until the sixth episode "that you really feel the pulp martial-arts-movie-riffing origins" thanks to episodic director RZA who "finally gives the show a proper sense of flair ... It's enough to make you wish they made him the showrunner." Jolin concluded, "Iron Fist works some fantastical flavor into the MCU's down-to-earth Defenders nook, but it needs more proper kung-fu flair than showrunner Buck allows."

Responding to these reviews, Jones said that "these shows are not made for critics, they are first and foremost made for the fans ... when the fans of the Marvel Netflix world and fans of the comic books view the show through the lens of just wanting to enjoy a superhero show, then they will really enjoy what they see." Jones later attributed the negative reviews to the fact that his character, "a white American billionaire", was similar to Donald Trump who had become "public enemy number one, especially in the US" between the making of the season and its release. In an article for Vox, Alex Abad-Santos said Jones was just attempting to "pass the blame" away from himself when the real problem with the season was "no one thought about what makes the character human". Abad-Santos suggested that the season be a warning to others telling stories about superheroes, who he thought needed to ensure they were "using established characters to touch on other topics—mental illness, parenthood, race, trauma—instead of simply rehashing old plots."

Fight scene criticisms 
Feinberg, in his review, criticized the fight sequences in the season, calling them "weakly staged and all-too-brief, without any effort to even pretend that the show's leading man is doing any of his own stunts" and felt "Danny's strength and his enhanced abilities are barely explained and inconsistently depicted." Sepinwall described the fighting in the season as "both brief and unconvincing", criticizing Jones' ability to perform the fights as well as the way they were filmed and edited. One fight sequence, featuring 56 cuts for just 35 seconds of footage, was highlighted by some fans and critics as emblematic of the season's fight problems, with The Independents Christopher Hooton saying the editing created this "disorientating, messy and ultimately not particularly impactful sequence". He compared it to what he believed to be the superior work of Jackie Chan, citing a single take fight scene featuring that performer, as well as the fight scenes from Daredevil which "had great success with a more considered shot selection and more minimal cutting than Iron Fist".

Aloysius Low at CNET also compared Jones's fighting in the season to that of Chan as well as Jet Li, saying, "There's none of that elegance I expect from a kung fu master, and he gets hit way too easily for a trained expert." Low also criticized the fact that Jones was unable to fight with both of his fists in the season, while noting that what he believed to be the best fight of the season was when Jones was faced with the drunken fist technique and was losing because of it with Rand only winning that fight due to "the inevitable invincibility of [his] plot armor". Brook H. at Pop Culture Uncovered felt that many of the season's fight scene issues stemmed from a decision to model Iron Fist on the American action films of the 1980s and 1990s, rather than updating the style of 1970s Hong Kong films: the season has "no fluidity, variety, interesting styles, or back-and-forth between combatants. These fights were an American interpretation of martial arts, using the visage of kung fu to mask nothing more than straightforward brawling." Brook H.'s piece noted that Chan had extensive experience working as a stunt coordinator, but limited time working as a fight choreographer before joining the series, while a professional fight choreographer discussing the season felt the choreography was not the problem as "I can see where the choreographers were going" but the actors, particularly Jones, were just not skilled enough to deliver on them. The quick cut editing was also criticized, again, as well as attempts to "slow-down Wachowski-style, only to speed right back up" which "failed miserably".

Casting controversy 

Following the announcement of the series, Russ Burlingame noted for ComicBook.com that Marvel may have been tempted to change Danny Rand from white to a person of Asian descent, especially given that the other Marvel Netflix series Jessica Jones and Luke Cage already set a precedent of increasing diversity by exploring a female and African-American lead, respectively. However, Burlingame was against this happening, wanting to see "the classic" version of the character, and feeling that making the character Asian simply because he is a martial artist was itself "quietly, subtlely racist". This situation, of casting either a white or Asian-American actor in the role, was described as "lose/lose" by Devin Faraci of Birth.Movies.Death, while Albert Ching at Comic Book Resources was strictly against casting an Asian-American. He said that any extra Asian-American representation onscreen would be positive, but that he was not comfortable with the idea of the first major Asian superhero in film or television being a martial artist. Ching questioned why this discussion had not been raised with any other character, and suggested that a non-white, non-Asian actor be cast instead to avoid either issues. He highlighted the casting of Chloe Bennet and Ming-Na Wen in the MCU series Agents of S.H.I.E.L.D., both in "non-stereotypical roles", as examples of what roles he would rather have Asian-Americans be cast in.

In response to this, Keith Chow at The Nerds of Color specifically asked Marvel to cast an Asian-American in the role. Chow focused on the lack of Asian-American representation in mainstream television and films, the fact that the character's story would not have to change to accommodate this difference, and how it would stop elements of the "white savior" trope being depicted where a "white-guy-is-better-at-being-Asian-than-the-Asians". Chow did not feel it was equivalent to simply add a different Asian hero to the series such as Shang-Chi as there is a difference between the experience of an Asian character and an Asian-American, with the latter still being able to have a "fish out of water" storyline as Rand does in the comics. Chow disagreed that it was racist to have an Asian-American martial artist, as martial arts are a natural part of an Asian-American's heritage and would not be the only thing the character does; he gave the example of Daniel Wu in Into the Badlands, the only other Asian American lead of a mainstream martial arts series, who agreed to star in that series despite the perceived stereotypes because of the characterization beyond fighting, and because his "culture did create kung fu, so is that a stereotype? No it's part of [my] history". Chow started the hashtag #AAIronFist on Twitter, beginning a movement that received support from "high profile people" such as Lexi Alexander and Gail Simone.

Marvel and Netflix became aware of the movement to cast an Asian-American as Danny Rand, particularly after Chow began writing on the subject in March 2014, and considered several Asian-American actors for the role. This included Lewis Tan, who went on to guest star as the villain Zhou Cheng in the season. However, by the time Buck was announced as showrunner in December 2015, the studios were "leaning toward keeping Iron Fist white." Jones, who is white, was cast in February 2016.

Following the casting, io9's Rob Bricken spoke out against commentators who accepted Jones's casting because Marvel had been in a "damned if they do, damned if they don't" situation, feeling this was not true because the benefits that could have come from casting an Asian-American actor—including having the character " his Asian heritage, instead of taking it from others"—outweighed just copying the stereotypes from the comics. His colleague Katharine Trendecosta later added, after watching the completed season, that an Asian-American Danny Rand would have been more interesting than the final version, especially in being able to explore how he felt about returning to America having become more of a stereotype, and feeling out of place in K'un Lun due to being American while feeling out of place among the high-society circles of America due to being Asian. In response to these criticisms, Jones agreed that "there needs to be more diversity in film and television" but was confused why Iron Fist in particular had been targeted by internet commentators and said that they should get angry at "real problems in the world" instead. After the irony of him championing diversity through his Twitter account was raised with Jones in March 2017, he added that the producers chose to lean in to the problematic aspects of the character and surround him with "one of the most diverse" casts of the Marvel Netflix series to create a "socially progressive story" without alienating the comic fan base. Jones subsequently took down his Twitter account.

In response to specific criticisms that Rand is a "white savior", Buck said that he had approached the character without knowing of the racial issues surrounding him and his comic history, and that "I can say most definitively Danny Rand is no white saviour. He's trying to save himself, if anything." Jones agreed, saying, "Danny Rand is not a white savior. Danny Rand can hardly save himself, let alone an entire race of people. He is a very complicated, vulnerable individual." Jones felt that changing K'un Lun to be a multi-cultural place for the series aided in lessening the white savior narrative, while stating, "It's up to the writers to address thematic and narrative choices. And it's up to us as actors to try and breathe life into these characters as truthfully and as honestly and with [as much] genuine passion as possible." Roy Thomas, co-creator of the character, also defended the season following accusations of cultural appropriation, saying that the character was created for a less "PC" time and that K'un Lun was always meant to be a mythical place rather than a representation of Asia. Thomas added that he would not be bothered if the character had been changed to Asian-American, but was not "ashamed" that Rand remained white.

Accolades 
The season was nominated for Best New Media Superhero Series at the 44th Saturn Awards, but lost to Marvel's own The Punisher.

References

External links 
 

2017 American television seasons
01